Aedis Eclipse: Generation of Chaos, known in Japan and South Korea as , is a turn-based strategy fantasy video game released for the PlayStation Portable. It was developed by Idea Factory and published by Nippon Ichi Software. The game was released in Japan on May 25, 2006, in North America on April 24, 2007 and in Europe on March 30, 2011. It is the sequel to Generation of Chaos.

Gameplay
As a sequel, the game features a different setting, new characters, and a refined battle system. As with the original Generation of Chaos, this follow-up combines strategic, turn-based planning with automatic, real-time battles. Players will move one of 40 commanders across three distinct worlds as they attempt to eliminate rivals from the playing field. Movement throughout each world is designed like a board game, with factions alternating turns and moving a fixed number of spaces to capture key buildings or to directly confront an enemy character.

Each commander under a player's control leads a distinct army, from wizards and demons to gladiators and insects, with certain unit types more advantageous against a rival's units than others. Once two factions share the same space on the board, a real-time battle ensues, with both armies fighting each other until all opposing units are defeated. Variables influencing each battle include formation type, terrain, weather, time of day, and more. While players cannot control troops directly, they can influence a battle's outcome by activating their commander's special abilities at pivotal moments.

The game has a combination of team customization and item crafting, with a dynamic combat multi-unit battle system.

Reception

The game received "mixed" reviews according to the review aggregation website Metacritic.

GameSpot stated that, "The sequel to Generation of Chaos provides more of the same strategic gameplay without doing anything to correct the problems with the original." IGN noted that, "While it's still an extraordinarily deep title on the PSP, the menu and battle systems are still extremely clunky and weakly implemented, and the lack of helpful information will easily start to fray the nerves of even the hardest strategy RPG fan." GamePro called the game "A solid RPG experience that is muddled by some unfortunate pathfinding and UI issues." In contrast, GameSpy commented, "Aedis Eclipse: Generations of Chaos shows a lot of potential, but [is] buried so deep that it's just about not worth digging for."

See also
 Generation of Chaos
 Generation of Chaos: Pandora’s Reflection

References

External links
 

PlayStation Portable games
PlayStation Portable-only games
2006 video games
Nippon Ichi Software games
Grand strategy video games
Turn-based strategy video games
Real-time tactics video games
Video games developed in Japan
Video games with isometric graphics
Multiplayer and single-player video games
Idea Factory games
Ghostlight games

ja:ジェネレーションオブカオス